The Yakima SunKings are a basketball team located in Yakima, Washington, covering the central Washington sports market of Yakima, Tri-Cities, and Ellensburg and plays at the Yakima SunDome. The team competed in the Continental Basketball Association from 1990 to 2008. In June 2005, the team was purchased by the Yakama Indian Nation and was renamed the Yakama Sun Kings (from Yakima to Yakama) to honor the Nation.

In 2018, a new version of the team was launched in North American Premier Basketball, which then rebranded as The Basketball League in 2019. The team won the regular season title in both seasons and won the playoff championship in 2018. The league lost western teams prior to the 2020 season and the new SunKings decided against participation in the league.

History
The franchise started in Kansas City, Missouri, then moved to Topeka, Kansas, and the Pacific Northwest. In 1990, the team was purchased by Sacramento attorney Robert Wilson and was led By GM Brooks Ellison. Ex-Major League Baseball Player Ted Bowesfield was hired as an adviser. Dianne LaBissionaire, Pat Beehler, and Jay Mahn conducted day-to-day operations. A local contest to select a name was held, and the Yakima Sun Kings was chosen, replacing the old name, "Sizzlers". The team hired local favorite Dean Nicholson as coach. Dennis Rahm became the play by play radio announcer and handled media releases.

The Sun Kings was the first team to show a profit in the history of the CBA. The team was fairly successful historically, given the inconsistent nature of minor-league basketball; they won the 1994–95, 1999–2000, 2002–03, 2005–06 and 2006-07 CBA championships. The Sun Kings had a disappointing 2003–04 season when they posted a 10–38 record. They were also 0–9 against the CBA Champion Dakota Wizards.

Ronny Turiaf, a draft pick of the Los Angeles Lakers in 2005, played nine games for the Sun Kings in the 2005–06 season, less than six months after undergoing open-heart surgery which caused the Lakers to void his contract. He averaged 13 points in nine games with the team before re-signing with the Lakers in January 2006.

The Sun Kings won their fourth CBA Championship with a 111–101 victory in Game 3 of a best-of-3 finals series against the Gary Steelheads on March 27, 2006.

In 2006–07 the Sun Kings repeated as champions, sweeping the Albany Patroons three games to none.

On April 10, 2008, the Yakama Nation shut down team operations due to financial losses.

On September 29, 2017, it was announced that the Yakima SunKings would be one of the founding franchises of the North American Premier Basketball. In October 2017, Paul Woolpert was rehired as its head coach and general manager. The team won the inaugural championship. The league became The Basketball League in 2019 and Woolpert left the team. The SunKings then removed itself from the league before the 2020 season as most of the western teams had folded.

Current roster

Notable former players

 Dennis Williams (born 1965), basketball player
Raja Bell (born 1976), basketball player

References

Basketball teams established in 1990
Basketball teams disestablished in 2008
Basketball teams established in 2017
Yakima, Washington
Continental Basketball Association teams
Basketball teams in Washington (state)
Former The Basketball League teams
Yakima Sun Kings
1990 establishments in Washington (state)
2008 disestablishments in Washington (state)
2017 establishments in Washington (state)